The 2014–15 UEFA Futsal Cup was the 29th edition of Europe's premier club futsal tournament and the 14th edition under the current UEFA Futsal Cup format.

Times are CET (UTC+1) during winter and CEST (UTC+2) during summer.

Preliminary round

Group A

Group B

Group C

Group D

Group E

Group F

Group G

Group H

Main round
Note: FC Lokomotiv Kharkiv (Ukraine) were originally drawn into Group 3 with hosts MFK Dina Moskva (Russia). Due to the Russia-Ukraine conflict, a draw was held to reallocate Lokomotiv, and they switched groups with Futsal Team Charleroi (Belgium).

Group 1

Group 2

Group 3

Group 4

Group 5

Group 6

Elite round
FC Barcelona, Kairat Almaty, Araz Naxçivan and Sporting CP received a bye to the Elite Round due to their coefficient ranking. The games were disputed between 18 and 23 of November 2014.

Group A

Group B

Group C

Group D

Final four
The finals will be hosted by Sporting CP, following a decision of the UEFA Executive Committee on 26 January 2015. The draw for the finals was made at half-time of the Primeira Liga match between Sporting CP and S.L. Benfica on 8 February 2015 at the Estádio José Alvalade, around 21:45 CET (UTC+1). The matches will be played at MEO Arena, Lisbon on 24–26 April 2015.

Semi-finals

Third place play-off

Final

Top goalscorers

References

External links

2014/15 final tournament, UEFA.com
UEFA Futsal Cup finals programme, UEFA.com

UEFA Futsal Champions League
Cup